Xerophyllum tenax is a North American species of plants in the corn lily family. It is known by several common names, including bear grass, soap grass, quip-quip, and Indian basket grass.

Ecology 
Xerophyllum tenax has flowers with six sepals and six stamens borne in a terminal raceme. The plant is a perennial herb that can grow to 15–150 cm in height. It grows in bunches with the leaves wrapped around and extending from a small stem at ground level. The leaves are 30–100 cm long and 2–6 mm wide, dull olive green with toothed edges. The slightly fragrant white flowers emerge from a tall stalk that bolts from the base. When the flowers are in bloom they are tightly packed at the tip of the stalk like an upright club. It produces small, tan coloured seeds that will germinate after a cold period of 12 to 16 weeks. The plant is found mostly in western North America from British Columbia south to California and east to Wyoming, in subalpine meadows and coastal mountains, and also on low ground in the California coastal fog belt as far south as Monterey County. It is common on the Olympic Peninsula and in the Cascades, northern Sierra Nevada and Rockies.

Xerophyllum tenax is an important part of the fire ecology of regions where it is native. It has rhizomes which survive fire that clears dead and dying plant matter from the surface of the ground. The plant thrives with periodic burns and is often the first plant to sprout in a scorched area.

Its fibrous leaves, which turn from green to white as they dry, are tough, durable, and easily dyed and manipulated into tight waterproof weaves.

Depending on site-specific and environmental conditions, plants may bloom every year or only once every decade, though back-to-back blooming of individual plants is rare.  It is a common myth that beargrass blooms every seven years, but depending on conditions such as moisture and temperatures there are periodically large concentrations of blooms.   

Deer and elk eat the flower and other parts of the plant. Bears eat the softer leaf bases.

Uses 
The Hupa people use this plant to create a border pattern in baskets.

This species has long been used by Native Americans who weave it in baskets, and historically, roasted the rootstock for food; they also ate the pods, which are good cooked. They also braid dried leaves and adorn them on traditional buckskin dresses and jewelry.

References

External links 

Jepson Flora Project: Xerophyllum tenax
Lady Bird Johnson Wild Flower Center, University of Texas
Montana Plant Life
Turner Photographics, Wildflowers of the Pacific Northwest
Flora of Eastern Washington and Adjacent Idaho, Eastern Washington University
Pacific Bulb Society, Xerophyllum

Melanthiaceae
Edible plants
Flora of Western Canada
Plants described in 1813
Flora of the Northwestern United States
Flora of the Southwestern United States
Flora without expected TNC conservation status